Momen Uddin Ahmed Politician of Khulna district of Bangladesh and organizer of liberation war who was a minister and member of parliament.

Career
Ahmed In the first parliamentary elections of 1973, he was elected as a Member of Parliament from the then Khulna-7 constituency as a candidate of Bangladesh Awami League.

He served as the Minister of State for Flood Control, Water Resources and Power in the cabinet of Mushtaq Ahmed from 20 August 1975 to 8 November 1975.

In the third parliamentary elections of 1986, he was elected a Member of Parliament from Khulna-6 constituency with the nomination of Jatiya Party. He served as the State Minister of Power in the cabinet of President Hussain Mohammad Ershad.

He was the Minister of Education of Bangladesh from 9 July 1986 to 30 November 1986.

References

Jatiya Party politicians
Living people
3rd Jatiya Sangsad members
State Ministers of Power, Energy and Mineral Resources
Year of birth missing (living people)